The Bregenzerwald is one of the main regions in the state of Vorarlberg (Austria). It overlaps, but is not coterminous with, the Bregenz Forest Mountains, which belong to a range of the Northern Limestone Alps, specifically the northern flysch zone. It is the drainage basin of the Bregenzer Ach river.

Geography
The regional inhabitants often divide the Bregenzerwald into two main areas, the Vorderwald ('Lower Bregenzerwald') and Hinterwald ('Upper Bregenzerwald'). The Vorderwald, with its hills and low mountains, is closest to the Rhine valley. The Hinterwald has the higher mountains, with altitudes of up to 2,000 metres. The two regions have distinctive dialect variations.

Villages 

The principal villages in the Bregenz Forest are Bezau (the local capital), Alberschwende, and Egg. Alberschwende, as a historic "Hofsteig" municipality was formerly not part of the Bregenz Forest region.

Lower Bregenz Forest (Vorderer Bregenzerwald) (red)
 Alberschwende
 Doren
 Sulzberg
 Langenegg
 Krumbach
 Riefensberg
 Lingenau
 Hittisau
 Sibratsgfäll

Upper Bregenz Forest (Hinterer Bregenzerwald) (blue)
 Egg
 Andelsbuch
 Schwarzenberg
 Bezau
 Reuthe
 Bizau
 Mellau
 Schnepfau
 Au
 Damüls
 Schoppernau
 Schröcken
 Warth

Nature reserves 

The Nagelfluhkette Nature Park is the first cross-border nature park between Germany and Austria and is therefore an international pilot project. It is 15,410 ha in size, comprises six Bavarian and eight Vorarlberg municipalities and forms the transition between the Allgäu and the Bregenzerwald. Nagelfluh is a conglomerate of round rocks that were compressed over 25 million years.

The Großes Walsertal Biosphere Reserve covers 19,231 ha. The biosphere reserve has been part of UNESCO since November 2000 and is Vorarlberg's first UNESCO reserve. It strives for a sustainable economy and tourism in the region and provides a platform for discussion about sustainability, society and politics. Of about 180 farms in the reserve, about 42 percent are organic farms.

Culture

Dialect 
Until 1814, parts of the Allgäu in the north and north-west belonged to Vorarlberg. Since the entire region was settled by the Alemanni, the Lake Constance Alemannic dialect became predominant beginning in the 5th and 6th centuries. Over the centuries there was a brisk trading of goods which, with the increased extension of marriages and family networks, led to a linguistic intermingling. Especially in the "Vorderwald" the influence of the Allgäu dialect is particularly noticeable. By contrast, in the Mittelwald and Hinterwald regions the predominant language forms show a stronger connection with the Hofsteig region and Dornbirn. Speakers outside of the Bregenzer Wald region perceive (Wälderisch) as an idiom of its own. It must be noted, however, that there is no uniform Vorarlbergisch dialect; there are considerable local and regional variations. The official language in Vorarlberg is, of course, High German (Hochdeutsch).

Bregenz Forest tracht 
Traditional costumes ("tracht") have a long history in Vorarlberg. Many valleys and villages have their own kind of garb, each with special characteristics from certain style periods. The Bregenzerwälder garb is the oldest of its kind in the Alpine region. It originated in the 15/16th century. The Bregenzerwälder tracht for women is called "d'Juppô" (Bavarian: "Juppe").

The Bregenz Forest is the only Austrian tracht region where there is a craftswoman for every detail of the costume: milliners, seamstresses, embroiderers, weavers and goldsmiths for the belt buckles. One of the last places that still manufacture the Juppe in the traditional way is the Juppenwerkstatt Riefensberg.

Cuisine 
The Bregenz Forest is well-known for its dairy products. The Vorarlberger Bergkäse is a popular product from the region.

The KäseStraße Bregenzerwald is a theme route based on the Bregenz Forest's traditional cheese production. Along the route, tourists can visit the Alps, alpine dairies, show dairies, the cheese cellar in Lingenau, the Alpine Dairy Museum and a beekeeping or brewery. The route was established in 1998 as an association of innkeepers, craftsmen and trading companies.

Architecture

The Guild of Au (Baroque period) 
The Auer Zunft (Guild of Au) was founded in Au by Michael Beer in 1651. It is an association of builders, sculptors and carpenters. In Au-Schoppernau from 1670 to 1700, more than 90 percent of all male workers were builders. Master builders and craftsmen from the Bregenz Forest in particular, but also from other parts of today's Vorarlberg, played a leading role in the 600 churches and monasteries that were built in the Baroque style in the 17th and 18th centuries. Members of the Guild of Au received 60 percent of the more than 700 major construction contracts awarded to Vorarlbergers.

Many important members of the Guild of Au came from the architect families Beer, Moosbrugger and Thumb.

Bregenzerwälderhaus 
The Bregenzerwald house is particularly relevant for the historical architecture in the Bregenz Forest. These are built in a mixed stone-wood construction and characterize the landscape. The Bregenzerwälderhaus combines the residential building, the stable and the barn under one roof. The oldest houses of this type were built in the 15th century. In the centre of Schwarzenberg are a few well-preserved and relatively uniform Bregenzerwald houses, all built around the same time - after the great fire of 1755.

Modern and contemporary architecture 
The Neue Vorarlberger Bauschule developed organically in the second half of the 20th century and always involved local craftsmen in the building process. With still recognizable typical Vorarlberg architecture, it combines tradition and modernity: clear lines, glass and local wood. Its harmonious mixture creates interesting contrasts like in half-timbered houses. Comfort and quality of life play a central role in the design of new houses in Vorarlberg. In many renovations of private homes and public buildings, local wood is preferred, which means that energy consumption can be minimised.

Well-known award-winning architectural projects are the Kunsthaus Bregenz, the vorarlberg museum in Bregenz, the Michelehof Hard and the Hotel Krone Hittisau.

In 2014, the modern architectural project BUS:STOP Krumbach was completed. When the municipality of Krumbach decided to rebuild seven bus stops in 2010, they hired seven international architects to design bus shelters. Local craftsmen executed their designs. While each stop differs in design, the bus stops are all meant to uniquely integrate architecture into the natural surroundings.

The Werkraum Bregenzerwald is an association of craftsmen in the Bregenz Forest founded in 1999. It aims at networking and supporting craft, design and technology businesses in the area. The publicly accessible place is used to present the craftsmanship, to promote building culture in cooperation with architects and to increase design competence and quality of craftsmanship with the preferred involvement of young people. The associated workshop building was designed by Peter Zumthor. The building was awarded the Austrian Builders' Prize (Österreichischer Bauherrenpreis) in 2014 and 2015.

Museums and sights 

The Schubertiade takes place annually in the summer in Schwarzenberg. At a Schubertiade, informal classical music is played and recited. The festival in Schwarzenberg focuses on compositions that are usually not played at larger concerts and may or may not be composed by Franz Schubert.

The Bregenzerwaldbahn ("'s Wälderbähnle") is a museum railway that runs on a remaining section of the narrow-gauge railway. From 1902 to 1983, the Wälderbähnle travelled the 35.5 km long route from Bregenz to Bezau. Until October 2004, a 6.1 km route was accessible, but a section had to give way to road construction. Today, a distance of 5 km from Bezau station via Reuthe to Schwarzenberg station is available.

In 2000, the Hittisau Women's Museum opened. It is the only museum of its kind in Austria. The museum is devoted to the display and documentation of the cultural works and stories of women, which deal with a broad variety of topics, including questions of female identity and gender roles.

The Angelika Kauffmann Museum in Schwarzenberg is dedicated to the painter Angelika Kauffmann.

Other museums of the Bregenz Forest region are the Museum of Baroque Master Builders in Au, Alpine Dairy Museum in Hittisau, the Egg Village Museum in Egg and the Franz Michael Felder museum in Schoppernau.

Economy 

Residents of the Bregenz Forest earn their living primarily from summer and winter tourism, agriculture and especially the wood processing industry. Many locals also commute to work in the Rhine Valley, Vorarlberg's economic center.

Agriculture and Alpine transhumance 
The Alpine transhumance or Alp farming is the basis of the traditional cheese making process in Vorarlberg. Farmers drive their livestock to where fodder is available. This means that they change stables several times a year depending on the season. In German, Alp farming is also called three-tier farming ("Dreistufenwirtschaft") because the pastures are managed in three tiers. In the spring of 2011, UNESCO declared the Alp farming in the Bregenzerwald to be an intangible cultural heritage.

The milk produced is then made into a variety of dairy products like Vorarlberger Bergkäse and sold in the valley dairies according to old tradition. Through traditional agriculture, the raw material milk is produced regionally and without silos.

The agricultural quota of the Bregenzerwald, i.e. the proportion of the population that derives its main income from agriculture, is extraordinarily high compared to the state of Vorarlberg, namely 9.5 % compared to 2.4 % (as of 1991).

Tourism 
Due to the great importance of tourism, the tertiary sector in the Bregenzerwald accounts for 50 %. 11.2 % of the working population works in the accommodation and catering sector. For comparison: the Vorarlberg average is 6.7 % (as of 1991).

Gallery

References

External links

Official website of the Bregenz Forest region
List of museums and exhibitions in the Bregenz Forest

Vorarlberg
Geography of Vorarlberg
Regions of Austria
Bregenz District
Alemannic German language